AC Monza Team eSports, or simply Monza, is the esports department of Italian football club Monza. The division was established in September 2019 as a FIFA team.

History 
Monza formed their esports team in September 2019, to compete in competitive FIFA games on PlayStation consoles. Simone Figura (Figu7rinho) and Raffaele Cacciapuoti (Er_Caccia98) were presented as the team's first pro players. Figura left in November 2020, and made way for Renzo Parave (Nzorello). Monza reached the 2021 FIFA eClub World Cup Europe semi-finals, and were ranked 12th in the overall rankings; they were the third-best professional football club in Europe, and fourth worldwide. In the 2021 eChampions League, Er_Caccia98 reached the final, losing to Danish player OliverPN; he won $50,000 for finishing second.

In January 2022, the Osservatorio Italiano Esports (OIES) presented their "OIES Badge" to a select few esports teams; Monza and Inter Milan were the only two football clubs to receive the certification. In October 2022, Cacciapuoti was confirmed in the roster for the fourth consecutive year, while Parave was replaced by Lucio Vecchione (HHezerS).

Roster

Current

Former

Achievements

References

External links
 
 FIFAe profile

esports
2019 establishments in Italy
Esports teams based in Italy
FIFA (video game series) teams